Terrells Creek is a  long 3rd order tributary to the Haw River, right bank in Chatham County, North Carolina.

Variant names
According to the Geographic Names Information System, it has also been known historically as:  
Terrell Creek

Course
Terrells Creek rises in a pond about 0.25 miles north of Silk Hope, North Carolina in Chatham County and then flows east-northeast to the Haw River about 1 mile north of Terrells.

Watershed
Terrells Creek drains  of area, receives about 47.4 in/year of precipitation, and has a wetness index of 424.76 and is about 55% forested.

See also
List of rivers of North Carolina

References

Rivers of North Carolina
Rivers of Chatham County, North Carolina